No. 220 Squadron (Desert Tigers) is a fighter squadron and is equipped with Su-30 MKIs and based at Halwara Air Force Station.

History
From its birth until just short of the Indo-Pak war of 1965, the role of the squadron was Operational Conversion onto Vampire aircraft of the freshly commissioned pilots. The squadron, later re-equipped with the Indigenous HF-24 Marut in April 1969 and flew the Marut in the 1971 Indo-Pak War. In June 1981, the squadron converted onto the MiG-23BN., It was raised at IAF Station Jodhpur and in year 1997 It moved to IAF Station Halwara.

IAF had disbanded the 220 Squadron in June 2005 because of very old aircraft, but resurrected that with the induction of the SU 30 MKIs on 25 September 2012. They received the President's standards at Halwara AFS on 20 September 2013.

Assignments
 Indo-Pakistani War of 1965
 Indo-Pakistani War of 1971

Aircraft

References

220